Fever Dreams Pts. 1-4 is the fourth studio album by English musician and guitarist Johnny Marr. It was released on 25 February 2022 on New Voodoo under license to BMG. The album is Marr's first double album and was preceded by two EPs: "Fever Dreams Pt. 1" and "Fever Dreams Pt. 2". The album peaked at Number 4, the highest chart position for his solo albums. The previous release, Call the Comet, peaked at Number 7.

Writing and recording 
The album was recorded during a lockdown period. Speaking of the album, Marr said:

“There’s a set of influences and a very broad sound that I’ve been developing – really since getting out of The Smiths until now, and I hear it in this record. There are so many strands of music in it. We didn’t do that consciously, but I think I’ve got a vocabulary of sound. And I feel very satisfied that I’ve been able to harness it. It’s an inspired record, and I couldn’t wait to get in and record every day. But I had to go inwards.”

The track "Receiver" is based on human attraction. Marr said in an interview with Kyle Meredith:

"Receiver is about erotic signals that we send to each other, quite often it's an amazing and a very interesting part of human psychology to me, that on a dance floor or in a bar or in a party, human attraction... the signals we send off to each other, they can be telegraphed explicitly and other times they're things we can pick up subliminally."

Talking to NME, Marr said of the track "Ariel", which is based on Sylvia Plath's poem 'Ariel'

“With a song like ‘Ariel’, I just felt like I wanted to sing something to do with empathy.”

Speaking of "Lightning People", Marr said:

“I wanted to pay tribute, in a way, to people who are interested in me, and listen to me. Even if it’s just for the five minutes of people listening to the song, to galvanize this idea of ‘us’. I deliberately used the language of soul music: "Bring it all my brothers. Bring it all my lovers. Be the Lightning People. Just like we’ll always be. It’s Glam Gospel.”

Marr said "Sensory Street" is a "story of a surreal 48 hours in subterranean England", and spoke about "Tenement Time" as:

"It’s about running around Ardwick [Manchester, England], bunking into warehouses and getting chased. That was the first time I was self-consciously into culture: around people who wore certain clothes, and it was part of being a little Manchester boy, really. I have a real romanticism about that period of my life.”

Speaking of "Night and Day", Marr said:

“I need songs after all the news, news, news. It gets too real in the hotspots, I’m trying to be positive, for me and my audience, really. My personality is such that it occurs to me to think that way. I’m not just writing with positivity for the sake of a song. It’s real, and it’s also very necessary.”

Critical reception 
The album received relatively positive reviews from most outlets, Writing for God Is in the TV, Laura Dean gave the album a 4.5 out of 5 stars, saying that the album "illustrates Johnny's versatility and talents for song writing, production and vocals". Emma Harrison from Clash Magazine gave the album an 8 out of 10, stating the album not only showcases Johnny Marr's ability as a guitarist but also as a songwriter to 'craft a series of strong tracks'. On Metacritic, the album earned an 82 out of 100, based on 12 critic scores.

However, Felix Rowe, of DIY Magazine, gave the album a mixed rating of 6 out of 10, saying the album "shines brightest when Marr lets his guitar do the talking."

Mojo gave the album 4 out of 5 stars, stating that "Fever Dreams is too long, uniform and persistent to enjoy in one sitting." Mark Beaumont, writing for the Independent , gave the album a 4 out of 5 as well, stating "Like the post-pandemic age, you never know what's coming next."

NME gave the album a 4 out of 5, Writer Andrew Trendell saying "It’s Marr’s restlessly prolific spirit that drives ‘Fever Dreams Pt 1-4’", “This album is the work of a man with no time for big cash reunions or the squabbling that prevents them. Instead, he has turned in a record fuelled by soul and new ideas.” 

Craig Mathieson of the Sydney Morning Herald gave the album a 4 out of 5 stars, concluding "Most of music’s greats eventually flounder, but Marr remains purposeful".

Track listing

Personnel 
Band:

 Johnny Marr: vocals, guitar, keyboards
 James Doviak: guitars, keyboards, vocals
 Iwan Gronow: bass guitar, vocals
 Jack Mitchell: drums

Additional personnel:

 Simone Marie: bass guitar on tracks 1, 5, 10
 Meredith Sheldon: backing vocals on tracks 1, 2 , 5, 6, 9, 10, 12, 14
 Nile Marr: backing vocals on "Hideaway Girl".
 Claudius Mittendorfer: mixing
 Russ Millar: recording assistant
 Mat Bancroft & Laura Turner: design and artwork
 Niall Lea: photography.

Singles 
"Spirit Power and Soul" was the lead single for the album, released on 31 August 2021.

"Tenement Time" was the second single, released on 8 November 2021, with the B-Side "Sensory Street".

"Night and Day" was released as the third single, with a single version that is 3 minutes and 41 seconds long, compared to the album version which is 4 minutes and 54 seconds long.

Charts 
"Spirit Power and Soul" peaked at Number 38 on the Best Selling Vinyl Singles of 2021.

Live Performance at the Crazy Face Factory 
Alongside the announcement for the album on 12 October 2021, Marr also announced a Live Stream named 'Live At The Crazy Face Factory', which was to premiere online from the 10 November until 14 November. Fans who had pre-ordered the album from the store, were able to access exclusive tickets to the show before the public sale began on 20 October.

Filmed at Crazy Face Factory, the show allowed fans "the chance to step inside [Marr’s] custom-built Crazy Face Factory studio where ‘Fever Dreams Pts 1-4’ was created" and Marr also "discuss[ed] his creative process and life in songwriting, alongside a set of full-band live performances from across his career".

There was also a trailer for the Stream

The Yorkshire Post reviewed the show, giving the explanation Marr stated for the name of the Studio:

"Marr reveals that the connection between the Crazy Face Factory’s name and the late Joe Moss, The Smiths’ first manager, who also owned the Crazy Face street clothing line. 'It’s partly a tribute to Joe and partly a tribute to my past.'"

References 

Rock albums by English artists
2022 albums
Johnny Marr albums